Cyber Anakin (also known by the handle cyberanakinvader) is the pseudonym of a computer hacktivist.

Career

In 2016, in retaliation against Russia for the shooting-down of Malaysia Airlines Flight 17, Cyber Anakin, who was then a teen, started targeting Russian websites and databases, including the news site and email provider km.ru and gaming company Nival Networks. The information gained during the breaches included dates of birth, encrypted passwords, and geographic locations. There were 1.5 million victims. The km.ru and Nival data breaches were confirmed by computer security researcher Troy Hunt. Cyber Anakin subsequently used the content of the km.ru data breach to assist Latvian independent news website Meduza in establishing the identity of a man who had been sexually harassing female chess players by sending them letters containing used condoms and pages from pornographic magazines.

In April 2018, Cyber Anakin took advantage of an error in a North Korean propaganda website that erroneously linked to a non-existent Twitter account. As an "April Fools prank" he registered a spoof account under that empty username and posted numerous anti-DPRK propaganda messages including unflattering images and obscene slurs directed against Kim Jong-un.

In June 2018, Cyber Anakin took advantage of a security flaw present in internet connected set-top boxes, to temporarily deface a small number of television sets with messages in opposition to Article 13 of the European Union's Directive on Copyright in the Digital Single Market. In an interview with ZDNet, he expressed concerns that the proposed filter will "let things which shouldn't to pass through and block those that should be allowed". He also said that the Internet "will become a boring, gloomy place" if MEP Axel Voss "has his way".

Following the shooting-down of Ukraine International Airlines Flight 752 in January 2020, Cyber Anakin defaced the website of the Khuzestan Water and Power Authority, placing the names of Flight 752's victims on its webpage.

See also
 List of hackers

References

Year of birth missing (living people)
Date of birth missing (living people)
Living people
Hacktivists